No. 127 Squadron RAF was a squadron of the United Kingdom's Royal Flying Corps and Royal Air Force.

History
It was first formed as a day bomber unit in February 1918, but was disbanded on 4 July of that year without seeing service.  From 29 June to 12 July 1941, the designation was assigned to a detachment of Hawker Hurricanes and Gloster Gladiators in service in Iraq before they were renumbered No. 261 Squadron. Thereafter, the designation was taken up again and the squadron who served in Egypt.

It returned to the UK for Operation Overlord (the Allied invasion of Normandy) when it was equipped with the Spitfire IX HF operating from RAF Lympne in Air Defence of Great Britain, though under the operational control of RAF Second Tactical Air Force (2nd TAF).

The squadron disbanded on 30 April 1945.

Notes

References
 Ken Delve, D-Day: The Air Battle, London: Arms & Armour Press, 1994, .

External links

Military units and formations in Mandatory Palestine in World War II
127
127